Handyman is an Australian television series which aired on Melbourne station HSV-7 from 1957 to 1958. Originally hosted by Jack Easton, it was later hosted by Colin Burns. It aired live, and consisted of "hints to the home handyman". It aired in a 15-minute time-slot on Sundays, later moved to Saturdays. It is not known if any of these episodes were kinescoped.

A different Handyman aired on ABV-2 around the same time.

References

External links

1957 Australian television series debuts
1958 Australian television series endings
English-language television shows
Black-and-white Australian television shows
Australian non-fiction television series